|}

The May Hill Stakes is a Group 2 flat horse race in Great Britain open to two-year-old fillies. It is run at Doncaster over a distance of 1 mile (1,609 metres), and it is scheduled to take place each year in September.

History
The event is named after May Hill, a successful filly whose victories included Doncaster's Park Hill Stakes in 1975. It was established in 1976, and was originally classed at Group 3 level. It was promoted to Group 2 status in 2003.

The May Hill Stakes is currently held on the second day of the four-day St. Leger Festival.

The leading horses from the race often go on to compete in the Fillies' Mile. The last to win both was Inspiral in 2021.

Records
Leading jockey (6 wins):
 Frankie Dettori – Calando (1998), Teggiano (1999), White Moonstone (2010), Lyric of Light (2011), Indigo Girl (2020), Inspiral (2021)

Leading trainer (12 wins):
 Henry Cecil – Formulate (1978), Bright Crocus (1982), Ever Genial (1984), Laluche (1986), Intimate Guest (1987), Tessla (1988), Rafha (1989), Midnight Air (1991), Solar Crystal (1995), Reams of Verse (1996), Midnight Line (1997), Half Glance (2001)

Winners

See also
 Horse racing in Great Britain
 List of British flat horse races

References
 Paris-Turf: 
 Racing Post:
 galopp-sieger.de – May Hill Stakes.
 horseracingintfed.com – International Federation of Horseracing Authorities – May Hill Stakes (2018).
 pedigreequery.com – May Hill Stakes – Doncaster.
 

Flat races in Great Britain
Doncaster Racecourse
Flat horse races for two-year-old fillies
Recurring sporting events established in 1976
1976 establishments in England